Yarmouth was a 44-gun fourth-rate frigate of the English Royal Navy, originally built for the navy of the Commonwealth of England at Great Yarmouth under the 1652 Programme, and launched in 1653. By 1666 her original armament of 44 guns (24-pounders on the lower deck, and a mixture of culverins and demi-culverins on the upper deck) had been increased to 52 guns by the addition of smaller cannon (sakers) on the quarter deck, and by 1677 she carried 54 guns.

Yarmouth took part in the Battle of Lowestoft in 1665, in the Four Days Battle and the St James's Day Fight in 1666, in the Battle of Solebay in 1672 and in the Battle of Schooneveld and Battle of Texel in 1673. She was broken up in 1680.

Notes

References

Lavery, Brian (2003) The Ship of the Line - Volume 1: The development of the battlefleet 1650-1850. Conway Maritime Press. .
Winfield, Rif (2009) British Warships in the Age of Sail 1603-1714: Design, Construction, Careers and Fates. Seaforth Publishing, .

Ships of the line of the Royal Navy
1650s ships